Coole Pilate Halt railway station was located in Coole Pilate, Cheshire, England. The station was opened by the Great Western Railway, the station closed on 9 September 1963.

References

Further reading

Disused railway stations in Cheshire
Railway stations in Great Britain opened in 1935
Railway stations in Great Britain closed in 1963
Former Great Western Railway stations